The 1997–98 Slovak Cup was the 29th season of Slovakia's annual knock-out cup competition and the fifth since the independence of Slovakia. It began on 29 July 1997 with Preliminary round and ended on 7 June 1998 with the Final. The winners of the competition earned a place in the qualifying round of the UEFA Cup Winners' Cup. Slovan Bratislava were the defending champions.

Preliminary round
The first legs were played on 29 July 1997. The second legs were played on 19 August 1997.

|}

First round
The games were played on 28 and 29 October 1997.

|}

Second round
The games were played on 11 and 12 November 1997.

|}

Quarter-finals
The games were played on 17 and 18 March 1998.

|}

Semi-finals
The first legs were played on 7 April 1998. The second legs were played on 28 April 1998.

|}

Final

References

External links
profutbal.sk 
Results on RSSSF

Slovak Cup seasons
Slovak Cup
Cup